Napoléon Dion (May 5, 1849 – February 4, 1919) was a Canadian politician.

Born in Trois-Pistoles, Canada East, Dion was a member of the Municipal council of Fraserville (Rivière-du-Loup) from 1885 to 1889, in 1898, and in 1899. He was acclaimed to the Legislative Assembly of Quebec for Témiscouata in 1900. A Liberal, he was re-elected in 1904 and 1908. In 1912, he was appointed postmaster to the Parliament of Quebec, a post he served in until his death in Fraserville in 1919.

References

1849 births
1919 deaths
People from Trois-Pistoles, Quebec
Canadian postmasters
Quebec Liberal Party MNAs